Southern Lapland ( or Peräpohja;  or Överbotten; lit. "Rear Bothnia") was the northernmost part of the historical province of Ostrobothnia, and has sometimes been considered a separate region, but it is now part of the Lapland region. It belonged to the province of Oulu for a long time, but from 1938 it formed the southern part of the province of Lapland, which was founded that year. Parts of the Salla-Kuusamo area, which included the easternmost part of southern Lapland, were ceded to the Soviet Union in 1940, after the end of the Winter War and again in 1944, after the end of the Continuation War.

The willow ptarmigan (Lagopus lagopus) is the regional bird of Southern Lapland.

Municipalities of Southern Lapland
Kemi
Kemijärvi
Keminmaa
Kolari
Pello
Posio
Ranua
Rovaniemi
Salla
Simo
Tervola
Tornio
Ylitornio

See also
 Laponia
 Peräpohjola dialects

References

Lapland (Finland)